Eilema chinchilla is a moth of the subfamily Arctiinae. It was described by Hervé de Toulgoët in 1957. It is found on Madagascar.

References

chinchilla
Moths described in 1957